Staten Island Community Board 1 is a local government unit of the city of New York, encompassing the Staten Island neighborhoods of Arlington, northern Castleton Corners, Clifton Concord, Elm Park, Fort Wadsworth, northern Graniteville, Grymes Hill, Livingston, Mariners' Harbor, northern Meiers Corners, New Brighton, Port Ivory,  Port Richmond, Randall Manor, Rosebank, Staten Island, St. George, Shore Acres, Silver Lake, Stapleton, Sunnyside, Tompkinsville, West New Brighton, Westerleigh, and northern Willowbrook. Community Board 1 is essentially the entire area of Staten Island north of the Staten Island Expressway. 

Community Boards play an advisory role in New York City government in the areas of land use, zoning, budget and municipal service delivery.

Its current chairperson is Nicholas Siclari, and its district manager is Joseph Carroll.
Leticia Remauro is a former chairperson.

References

External links
Official site of the Community Board

Community boards of Staten Island